Pardis Mahdavi is an American scholar and the Provost and Executive Vice President of the University of Montana.  Previously, she served as Dean of Social Sciences at Arizona State University. Previouslym she was Acting Dean of  Josef Korbel School of International Studies at the University of Denver. Prior to that, she served as Dean of Women, and Chair and professor of anthropology at Pomona College.

Biography
Mahdavi received her BA in diplomacy and world affairs from Occidental College; an MA in anthropology from Columbia University; an MIA (Master of International Affairs) from Columbia University; and a PhD in sociomedical sciences and anthropology from Columbia University.

Career and research
She has been a fellow at the American Council of Learned Societies, the Social Science Research Council, the Woodrow Wilson Center, and Google Ideas. Appointed by Governor Hickenlooper and re-appointed by Governor Jared Polis, Mahdavi served on the Colorado Commission on Higher Education for two years.

Mahdavi's research covers in labor, migration, gender, sexuality, human rights, youth culture, transnational feminism and public health, specializing in the context of shifting political and global structures. Her global area of expertise is the Middle East, and she has published many books and articles focusing on the area. She is also a frequent contributor to the Huffington Post and has published numerous groundbreaking works focusing on different issues affecting the Middle East.

Influential publications 

Mahdavi's first book, Passionate Uprisings: Iran's Sexual Revolution was published by the Stanford University Press in 2008 and has been a foundation in the discourse on Iran's changing sexual landscape. The book is a personal narrative based on Mahdavi's own experiences in Iran, as well as first person testimony of young Iranians participating in this modern sexual revolution. The work focuses on the intersection of youth, sexuality, politics and leisure, and highlights how the youth are changing social mores and in effect destabilizing the fundamentalist government.

Her second book is titled Gridlock: Labor, Migration, and Human Trafficking in Dubai and was published in May 2011 by Stanford University Press. Mahdavi investigates Dubai as it has long been accused of being an epicenter of human trafficking. Her investigation provides research suggesting that Dubai is more complicated than the stereotypes suggest, and is more a city of migrants who are not all trapped, tricked and taken advantage of. Her research contrasts first person testimonies of migrants living in Dubai with interviews with U.S. politicians to show the disconnect between reality in Dubai and the discourse surrounding the nation.

Teaching career 

Associate Professor and Chair of Anthropology 2011–2017
Assistant Professor of Anthropology, Pomona College 2006–2017
Visiting Assistant Professor of Public Health, New York University, Summer 2007
Teaching Assistant, Columbia University School of Public Health, 2006
Teaching Assistant, Barnard College, 2005
Research Assistant, Columbia University School of Public Health, 2005
Visiting Scholar, Tehran University, 2004
Instructor, School of International Affairs, Columbia University, 2003
Practicum Coordinator, Columbia University School of Public Health, 2002

Selected works

Books
From Trafficking to Terror (Routledge, 2014)
Gridlock: Labor, Migration, and Human Trafficking in Dubai (Stanford University Press, 2011)
Passionate Uprisings: The Intersection of Sexuality and Politics in Post-Revolutionary Iran (Stanford University Press, 2008)

Articles
"Youth, Sexuality and Politics in Post-Revolutionary Iran," in Handbook on Sexuality, Health and Human Rights (P. Aggleton and R. Parker, eds., Routledge, 2010)
"Who Will Catch Me if I Fall? Health and the Infrastructure of Risk for Urban Iranians" in Contemporary Iran (A. Gheissari, ed., Oxford University Press, 2009)
“Girls Just Wanna Have Fun,” Anthropology News, October 2008
“Passionate Uprisings: the Intersection of Sexuality and Politics in Post-Revolutionary Iran,” Culture, Health and Sexuality, Fall 2007
“Fashion and the Meaning of Tehrani Style,” Anthropology News, March 2007
“Iran’s Cyber-Sexual Revolution,” ISIM Review (Institute for the Study of Islam in the Modern World), Spring 2007
“Women, Gender and Sexualities: Modern Sex Education Manuals: Iran” and “Women, Gender and Sexualities: Practices: Iran,” in Encyclopedia of Women in Islamic Cultures (S. Joseph and A. Najmabadi, eds., Harvard Press, 2005)

Honors
Pomona College, Wig Distinguished Professor Award for Excellence in Teaching, 2012, 2017
National Development and Research Institute, Behavioral Science Training Fellowship, 2004–present
Woodrow Wilson Foundation, Fellowship in Women’s Health, 2005—present
Institute for Social and Economic Research Policy, Fellowship, 2005–present
Society for Medical Anthropology/Society for Applied Anthropology, Del Jones Award for outstanding research to underserved populations, 2006
American Public Health Association, Outstanding Student Award in recognition of innovative and outstanding new scholarship in the field of public health, 2005
Asia Society's top leaders in Asia, 2008

See also 
 List of American print journalists
 Middle Eastern Studies
 Tehran Times
 Huffington Post
 Human rights in Iran
 Crime in the United Arab Emirates

References

External links 
 "Traffic Jam: Gender, Labor, Migration and Trafficking in Dubai"
 "Pardis Mahdavi"
 "Pardis Mahdavi"
 "Pardis Mahdavi"

American women non-fiction writers
Pomona College faculty
Living people
American people of Iranian descent
Year of birth missing (living people)
21st-century American non-fiction writers
21st-century American women writers